Gokwe Centre is a rural town in the Midlands province in Zimbabwe.  The town is usually referred to as "Gokwe Centre" because the larger region is called Gokwe.

Background

Gokwe was originally a government station. It housed a district commissioner, police, hospital, veterinary services and other government rural agencies. Primarily for the administration of the district, it was also the base for the control of the tsetse fly and its associated lethal disease trypanosomiasis (sleeping sickness).

Historical Achievements

Growth Point Status

The place was proclaimed a Growth Point in 1982 under the government's growth points policy.

Gokwe town is a success case of the government's growth point policy whose results in July 2006 culminated in the proclamation by the state that it becomes a town.

Town Status

Gokwe Growth Point then run by the Gokwe South Rural District Council rapidly turned into a town skipping the Rural Service Center status because of its rapid developmental rate courtesy of the Kwekwe-Gokwe Highway which brought a much needed connectivity to all parts of Zimbabwe through its Kwekwe end link into the A5 Harare to Bulawayo highway.

Caretaker Commission

The step to establish the administrative machinery of the town included the putting in place of a commission appointed by the minister for local government in 
terms of the urban councils act Chapter 29.15.9.2(b).
This appointed commission was to run office until the coming in of elected councilors.

Town Council

Initial Committee 2008

The delimitation team divided Gokwe Center into 6 wards for the 2008 harmonized elections. Consequently, six councilors were elected, and as required two special interest councilors were appointed by the minister in terms of the urban councils act to form the first ever Gokwe Town Council.

Subsequent Committees

From the 2013 harmonized elections Gokwe Town Council is set in place and run according to the Urban Councils Act Chapter 29:15.

Gokwe Town Council is affiliated to the Urban Councils Association of Zimbabwe and Councilor Esther Senga of Ward 3 (Green Valley) is a committee member of the Presidential Committee of UCAZ.

2008 to 2013 Elected Councillors

2008 Local Government Election Results: MIDLANDS PROVINCE: Gokwe Town

1 Tangwara Onias  MDC Tsvangirai

2 Sibanda Sithabiso___ MDC Tsvangirai

3 Mashizha Elizabeth_ MDC Tsvangirai

4 Mudondo Darlington___ MDC Tsvangirai

5 Mutegwe Lisias __ MDC Tsvangirai

6 Chipfuko Vengesai_ MDC Tsvangirai

2013-2018 Councillors

|SEE 2013_Local Authorities Election Results GOKWE TOWN | External Link

(Ward, name and Political Party)

 1 Taruvinga Davis Zanu-PF
 2 Nyamukasa Duncan  (Zanu-PF)
 3 Senga Esther (female) (Zanu-PF)
 4 Mapfunde Fastimo (Zanu-PF)
 5 Mlanga Jameson MDC-T
 6 Mafa Manuel  (Zanu-PF)

Operations

Service Delivery
Gokwe Town Council has Four Department, namely 1. HR and Admin 2. Finance 3. Engineering (Works and Services) and 4. Housing, Health and Community Services. 

The town council has built a $300,000 administration block as part of its service delivery.

Refuse collection is done on regular bases and the council has engaged voluntary organizations such as religious groups, churches and women's clubs for litter monitoring, on the Keep Gokwe Clean campaign.

Cheziya High School is the most known institution which offers A'level courses.

Commerce and Industry

Industry in Gokwe is dominated by small scale formal and informal Entrepreneurs. However a number of standard industrial organizations are increasingly filtering in.

Gokwe Town apart from scores of smaller retail shops six major indigenous supermarkets and wholesalers of international standards; Spar, Metro Peach, Choppies, Nyaningwe, Eden Supermarket and Agro Foods are the pride of Gokwe. There are also modern night spots, the Chicago Sports Club, Junior Sports Bar, Gokwe Hotel and Pumba Lodge.
 
Banks like Barclays bank, CBZ, POSB and other financial houses are also in town, the Agricultural Bank of Zimbabwe Ltd. (Agribank) topping the list.

Residential Areas

Gokwe town has six suburban settlements that include the low density, medium density and the high density.

Low density

 Green Valley
 Sasame

Medium Density

 Cheziya
 Nyaradza

High density

 Njelele
 Mapfungautsi
Currently under MDC supervision

Plots
 Njelele Agro-plots

Population

On estimation there are just less than 30 000 inhabitants in Gokwe town.

In 2012 according to the Zimbabwe National Statistics Agency (Zimstat), the town had 6 524 households, housing 10 914 male and 13 140 female mixed lingua residents.

Total population was 24 054, males being 45.4% of the total while female residents were the majority at 54.6%. The growth rate is 2.2%.

By the look of these statistics Gokwe has become bigger than some towns which got town status before Gokwe was even well known business center.

In 2012 
 Shurugwi which was established in 1899 by the BSAC had 21 905 residents and 5 879 households.
 Gwanda which is the provincial capital of Matabeleland South Province had 20 227 residents and 5 765 households.
 Plumtree had 11626 residents and just 3354 households.

Government Departments

There are various government departments in Gokwe town that include the

 Social Welfare
 Ministry of Youth,
 Justice Ministry represented by Magistrate Court,
 Ministry of Education,
 Home Affairs,
 The District Administrator’s office for the Ministry of Local Government and Urban Development,
 Ministry of Transport that oversees the Kwekwe-Gokwe Highway and other roads and road traffic related matters. 
Ministry of Agriculture represented by AGRTEX official and the Department of Livestock and Veterinary Services.
 Water Resources Ministry represented by Zimbabwe National Water Authority (ZINWA) is one other ministry working flat out because all the water that the town needs for both domestic and industrial needs is borehole water. There are no nearby dams to supply the town with cheap water.

Parastatals

Parastatal organizations at the center are the 
 Cotton Company of Zimbabwe (Cottco),
 Zimbabwe Electricity Transmission Distribution Company. (ZETDC),
 Grain Marketing Board,
 Zimbabwe National Water Authority (ZINWA)
 Public Service Commission
 Forestry Commission

to name a few.

Schools

There are Four Primary Schools and Four Secondary Schools in Gokwe Town.
Primary Schools
1. St Paul's Primary School
2. Mapfungautsi Council Primary School
3. CZM Primary School
4. Gokwe Town St Agness Primary School

Secondary Schools
1. Cheziya Council High School
2. St Paul's High School
3. Njelele Government High School
4. LOGOS Empowerment Girls High School

Public Service

 The Zimbabwe Republic Police (ZRP),
 The Magistrate’s Court
 The Zimbabwe Prison Services.
 Gokwe Hospital

Communications

 TelOne for telecommunications.
 ZimPost for postal services.
 Econet Celluer network provider.
 Telecel  Celluer network provider.
 NetOne  Celluer network provider.

Transportation

 An aerodrome for small private planes which is popularly called Gokwe Airport.
 Bus station: Built up; with toilets, loading bays

See also

Kwekwe-Gokwe Highway
Mutange Dam

References

Populated places in Midlands Province
Gokwe South District